1985 Pan Arab Games 

 Morocco, Casablanca
 August 3–8

MEN

100m

200m

400m

800m

1500m

5000m

10,000m

Marathon

3000SC

110H

400H

HJ

PV

LJ

TJ

SP

DT

HT

JT

20kmW

Decathlon

4x100m

4x400m

WOMEN

100m

200m

400m

800m

1500m

3000m

100H

400H

HJ

LJ

SP

DT

JT

Heptathlon

4x100m

4x400m

Medal table

References 
1985 Pan Arab Games
Athletics at the Pan Arab Games